The 1951 LOT Li-2 Tuszyn air disaster occurred on 15 November 1951 when a LOT Polish Airlines Lisunov Li-2 flew into power lines near Tuszyn, crashed and burst into flames. All 15 passengers and 3 crew died. It was the first LOT aircraft disaster since the end of World War II.

Incident
On 15 November 1951 a LOT Lisunov Li-2 was en route from Łódź to Kraków–Balice. Shortly after take-off while flying through Górki Duże near Tuszyn it flew into power lines, crashed and went into flames. All 15 passengers and 3 crew died. The Captain of the flight was Marian Buczkowski, father of Polish actor Zbigniew Buczkowski. The official cause of the disaster was attributed to bad weather conditions (low clouds and fog) and pilot's error.

According to a journalist investigation, due to lack of documentation in LOT archives, the events leading to the crash might have been different. The Li-2 flew in from Szczecin that day and after landing Buczkowski pointed out that one of the engines may be faulty and refused to fly again. Threatened with a pistol by a Security officer who wanted to get to Kraków he reluctantly agreed. Due to the faulty engine the plane stalled, tipped over the power lines and crashed into a field.

On 27 November 2010 an obelisk was erected to commemorate Captain Buczkowski, the crew and passengers.

References

Aviation accidents and incidents in Poland
Accidents and incidents involving the Douglas DC-3
Aviation accidents and incidents in 1951
LOT Polish Airlines accidents and incidents
1951 in Poland
November 1951 events in Europe
Łódź East County
Airliner accidents and incidents caused by engine failure
1951 disasters in Poland